The men's team sprint at the 2006 Commonwealth Games took place on March 19, 2006 at the Melbourne Multi Purpose Venue.

Results

Qualification

Finals

Bronze medal

Gold medal

References

Track cycling at the 2006 Commonwealth Games
Cycling at the Commonwealth Games – Men's team sprint